Back Centre is a community in the Canadian province of Nova Scotia, located in the Lunenburg Municipal District in Lunenburg County.

References 
 Back Centre on Destination Nova Scotia

Communities in Lunenburg County, Nova Scotia